AWS Glue is an event-driven, serverless computing platform provided by Amazon as a part of Amazon Web Services. It is a computing service that runs code in response to events and automatically manages the computing resources required by that code. It was introduced in August 2017. 

The primary purpose of Glue is to scan other services in the same Virtual Private Cloud (or equivalent accessible network element even if not provided by AWS), particularly S3. The jobs are billed according to compute time, with a minimum count of 1 minute. Glue discovers the source data to store associated meta-data (e.g. the table's schema of field names, types lengths) in the AWS Glue Data Catalog (which is then accessible via AWS console or APIs).

Languages supported 
Scala and Python are officially supported .

Catalog interrogation via API
The catalog can be read in AWS console (via browser) and via API divided into topics including:
 Database API
 Table API
 Partition API
 Connection API
 User-Defined Function API
 Importing an Athena Catalog to AWS Glue

See also
 Event-driven architecture
 Serverless Framework
 Serverless computing
 Function as a service
 Oracle Cloud Platform
 Google Cloud Functions
 Azure Functions

References

External links
 

Glue
Serverless computing